Gerald Melzer (born 13 July 1990) is a professional Austrian tennis player. As a qualifier, he reached the semifinals of Munich in 2015. He achieved a career-high singles ranking of world No. 68 in November 2016.

He is the younger brother of top Austrian tennis player Jürgen Melzer (hence his nickname, Mini Melts) and is the son of Rudolf Melzer, an Austrian businessman and mayor of Deutsch-Wagram, and Michaela, a saleswoman.

Career
Gerald Melzer has primarily spent his time on the Futures circuit, while also playing challengers and several doubles events with his brother. He began playing on the tour in 2007, competing in tournaments in Austria as well as Futures tournaments in Africa. 

He has had more success playing doubles, partnering with his brother to win a challenger in Graz, Austria. Gerald faced his brother, Jürgen, in the first round of the 2015 Wimbledon qualifying tournament, and lost in straight sets. Jürgen described it as the "worst tennis day of my life and I hope we will never play each other again."

At the 2017 Australian Open, Melzer lost in the first round to Australian Alex De Minaur in five sets. He held a match point in the fourth set, but was unable to close it out.

Gerald is also part of Austrian Davis Cup team, where he has 4 singles wins and 6 losses.

Singles performance timeline 

Current through the 2021 Davis Cup Finals.

ATP Challenger and ITF Future titles

Singles: 19

Doubles: 17

References

External links
 
 
 

1990 births
Living people
Austrian male tennis players
Tennis players from Vienna